Molly Picon (born Malka Opiekun; February 28, 1898 – April 5, 1992) was an American actress of stage, screen, radio and television, as well as a lyricist and dramatic storyteller.

She began her career in Yiddish theatre and film, rising to a star, before transitioning into character roles in English-language productions.

Early life
Picon was born Malka Opiekun (Anglicized first to Pyekoon, later Picon) in New York City, to Polish-Jewish immigrants Clara (née Ostrow), a wardrobe mistress, and Louis Opiekun, a shirtmaker. Opiekun is a Polish language name meaning "guardian" or "caretaker". The family relocated to Philadelphia, Pennsylvania, when she was three years old.

Career
Picon began as a child actor in the Yiddish Theatre at age six. In 1912, she debuted at the Arch Street Theatre in Philadelphia and became a star of the Yiddish Theatre District, performing in plays in the District for seven years. Picon was so popular in the 1920s, many shows had her adopted name, Molly, in their title. In 1931, she opened the Molly Picon Theatre.

Picon appeared in many films, beginning with silent movies. Her early films were made in Europe; among the first, and earliest to survive, was the Yiddish language East and West, a film adaptation of the 1921 play Mezrach und Maarev produced in Vienna in 1923. The film depicts a clash of New and Old World Jewish cultures. She plays a US-born daughter who travels with her father back to Galicia in East Central Europe. Her husband Jacob Kalich played one of her close relatives. 

Picon's most famous picture, Yidl Mitn Fidl (1936), was filmed on location in Poland and shows her wearing male clothing throughout most of the movie. The story concerns a girl and her father who are forced by poverty to set out on the road as traveling musicians. For her safety, she disguises herself as a boy, which becomes inconvenient when she falls in love with one of the other musicians in the troupe. Another of her films, Mamele, was also shot in Poland.

In 1934, Picon had a musical comedy radio show, The Molly Picon Program, broadcast on WMCA in New York City. In 1938, she starred another radio program on WMCA,   I Give You My Life. That program "combined music and dramatic episodes that purported to be the story of her life." Two years later, she starred in Molly Picon's Parade, a variety show on WMCA.

Picon made her English language debut on stage in 1940. On Broadway, she starred in the Jerry Herman musical Milk and Honey in 1961. In 1966, she dropped out of the disastrous Chu Chem during previews in Philadelphia; the show closed before it reached Broadway.

Picon had a bit part in the 1948 film The Naked City as the woman running a news-stand and soda fountain towards the climax of the film. Her first major Anglophonic role in the movies was in the film version of Come Blow Your Horn (1963), with Frank Sinatra. One of her best-known film roles was as Yente the Matchmaker in the 1971 film adaptation of the Broadway hit Fiddler on the Roof.

Picon appeared as Molly Gordon in an episode of CBS's Gomer Pyle, USMC and had a recurring role as Mrs. Bronson in the NBC police comedy Car 54, Where Are You?. In the comedy For Pete's Sake (1974), she appeared as an elderly madam ("Mrs. Cherry") who arranges a disastrous stint for Barbra Streisand on a job as a call girl. She later had television roles on the soap opera Somerset and appeared in a few episodes of The Facts of Life as Natalie's grandmother. Picon's final role was as Roger Moore's mother in the comedies Cannonball Run and its sequel Cannonball Run II in 1981 and 1984, respectively.

Books
Picon wrote So Laugh a Little (1962), a biography about her family. In 1980, she published her autobiography, Molly!.

Personal life
Picon was married to actor and playwright Yankel (Jacob) Kalich from 1919 until his death from cancer in 1975. They had no children.

Picon died on April 5, 1992, aged 94, from Alzheimer's disease in Lancaster, Pennsylvania. She and her husband are interred in the Yiddish Theater section of the Mount Hebron Cemetery in Flushing, Queens, New York City.

Legacy
 An entire room was filled with her memorabilia at the Second Avenue Deli in New York City (whose Second Avenue location is now closed)
 The New Century Theatre, a former legitimate Broadway theatre at 932 Seventh Avenue and West 58th Street in Midtown Manhattan (since closed and demolished), was briefly known as the Molly Picon Theatre in 1943.
 She was inducted into the American Theatre Hall of Fame in 1981.
 Picon Pie, a biographical play, ran off-Broadway from 2004 to 2005.
 In 2007, she was featured in the film Making Trouble, a tribute to female Jewish comedians, produced by the Jewish Women's Archive.
 Costumes she wore in various theater productions are displayed at the National Museum of American Jewish History in Philadelphia.

Filmography

References

Sources
 Eth Clifford. Molly Picon – So Laugh a Little, Messner, 1962 (see ).
 Lila Perl, Donna Ruff. Molly Picon: A Gift of Laughter, Jewish Publication Society, 1990, .

External links

 
 
 
 Guide to the Papers of Molly Picon (1898-1992) at the American Jewish Historical Society, New York.
 Pages from a Performing Life: The Scrapbooks of Molly Picon at American Jewish Historical Society
 Women of Valor exhibit on Molly Picon at the Jewish Women's Archive
 

1898 births
1992 deaths
20th-century American actresses
Actresses from New York City
American child actresses
American autobiographers
20th-century American memoirists
American film actresses
American silent film actresses
American stage actresses
American television actresses
American people of Polish-Jewish descent
Burials at Mount Hebron Cemetery (New York City)
Deaths from Alzheimer's disease
Neurological disease deaths in Pennsylvania
Jewish American comedians
Jewish American actresses
Vaudeville performers
Yiddish theatre performers
Yiddish film actors
Jewish American female comedians
20th-century American Jews